The 2022 European BMX Championships consists of two separate championships: BMX racing  and freestyle BMX. 
European BMX racing Championships  was held  in Dessel, Belgium on 8-10 July. 
European Freestyle BMX Championships was held in Munich, Germany on 11-13 August as part 2022 European Championships

Medal summary

Racing

Freestyle

References

European BMX Championships
European Championships
European BMX Championships
European BMX Championships
International cycle races hosted by Belgium
International cycle races hosted by Germany
European BMX Championships
European BMX Championships
Sports competitions in Munich
Sport in Antwerp Province
2022 European Championships